Seven Times Seven is a 1968 Italian crime comedy caper directed by Michele Lupo and starring Gastone Moschin.

Plot
A gang of prison inmates escape and rob the UK's Royal Mint. They then sneak back to prison.

Cast
 Gastone Moschin as Benjamin Burton
 Lionel Stander as Sam car thief
 Raimondo Vianello as Bodoni
 Gordon Mitchell as Big Ben
 Paolo Gozlino as Bingo (as Paul Stevens)
 Nazzareno Zamperla as Bananas
 Teodoro Corrà as Briggs
 Erika Blanc as Mildred
 Terry-Thomas as Police Inspector
 Turi Ferro as Bernard
 Adolfo Celi as Jail Manager
 Paolo Bonacelli as Jail warden
 Ray Lovelock as Mildred's lover
 Gladys Dawson as Miss Higgins
 Neil McCarthy as Prison warden Mr. Docherty

References

External links
 

1968 films
1968 comedy films
1960s crime comedy films
1960s heist films
Italian crime comedy films
Italian heist films
1960s Italian-language films
Films directed by Michele Lupo
Films with screenplays by Sergio Donati
Films scored by Armando Trovajoli
1960s Italian films